Robert Hamond Elwes (1856 – 28 January 1881) was a Lieutenant in the Grenadier Guards famous for having died valiantly at the Battle of Laing's Nek, South Africa as immortalized in Elizabeth (Lady Butler) Thompson's painting, "Floreat Etona!" (1898).

Family and early life

Elwes was born in 1856 to Robert Elwes and Mary Frances Lucas at Congham House, near King's Lynn in Norfolk. He was educated at Eton College.  After graduating, he joined the Grenadier Guards where he gained the rank of Lieutenant in November 1879.

The First Boer War

Following the Boer declaration of independence for the Transvaal in 1880 the British suffered a series of disastrous defeats in attempting to regain the territory. At the outbreak of the war Elwes shipped out to South Africa where he was seconded from the 3rd Battalion, Grenadier Guards to the 58th Regiment and appointed Aide-de-Camp to Major-General Sir George Pomeroy Colley, then the British High Commissioner for South East Africa and Commander-in-Chief of Natal. On 9 January 1881 Elwes dined at Government House at Pietermaritzburg with Colley, his wife, Lady Colley, and other officers and members of the general's staff. Guests included the author H. Rider Haggard. The next day Elwes left Pietermaritzburg with the British Natal Field Force led by Colley who took them into the Transvaal via Newcastle and Laing's Nek to Pretoria to relieve the garrisons in the besieged towns who were desperately short of food and ammunition.

The Battle of Laing’s Nek

On the morning of 28 January, Colley tried to force a way through the pass. But the Boers, under the command of Commandant-General Joubert, had about 2,000 men in the area, with at least 400 fortifying the heights around Laing's Nek. Over-eager commanders drove their men so hard up the steep slope in their anxiety to get at the enemy that when the decisive charge was actually made, the exhausted infantrymen and cavalry came nowhere near the Boer defences before being mown down. At around 11.00am, Colonel Deane along with Elwes and other members of General's staff were ordered to lead the 58th up the hill, riding to their certain death against the Boer bullets. An eyewitness of the attack on described the incident:

"Poor Elwes fell among the 58th. He shouted to another Eton boy (an Adjutant of the 58th whose horse had been shot), 'Come along Monck! Floreat Etona! We must be in the front rank!’ And he was shot immediately".

The event was immortalized in Elizabeth Thompson's painting, "Floreat Etona!" (1898). Among those killed beside Elwes during that heroic charge were Major Poole, and Lieutenants Dolphin and Inman of the General's staff.

Elwes is buried at Mount Prospect Cemetery, Natal.

References

External links
 Illustrated London News 1881
 Guard's Memorial
 ArtNet: Floreat Etona!, 1882 

People educated at Eton College
Grenadier Guards officers
1856 births
1881 deaths
People from King's Lynn
British military personnel killed in the First Boer War